Namhan (literally South Han) may refer to:

 "South Korea" in the South Korean dialect of Korean (in relation to names of Korea)
 Namhansan or Namhan Mountain, in Seoul, South Korea
 Namhan River, in South Korea

See also 
 Bukhan (disambiguation)